Zano may refer to:

People
 Brandon Zano, former member of Downplay, an American alternative metal band
 Moris Zano (born 1958), Israeli former footballer
 Nick Zano (born 1978), American actor
 Tzazo (died 533), also known as Zano, brother of King Gelimer, the last Germanic ruler of the North African Vandal Kingdom

Places
 Zano, Bam, Burkina Faso, a village
 Zano, Boulgou, Burkina Faso, a town

Other uses
 Zano (drone), a failed quadcopter drone Kickstarter project
 Aero Zano (airline code: ZANO), a Mexican airline - see List of airline codes